Testis-expressed sequence 10 protein is a protein that in humans is encoded by the TEX10 gene.

TEX10 forms part of a complex with WDR18, LAS1L called the rixosome that participates in RNA degradation, ribosomal RNA (rRNA) processing and ribosome biogenesis.

References

Further reading